Albert Reginald MacDougall (October 17, 1902 – January 20, 1953) was a Canadian politician. He served in the Legislative Assembly of British Columbia from 1946 to 1953  from the electoral district of Vancouver-Point Grey, a member of the Progressive Conservatives. He was an alumnus of Mount Allison University and Merton College, Oxford, where he matriculated in 1923 as a Rhodes Scholar. He died in office from cancer in 1953.

He was the son of William McDougall and Josephine Trites McDougall.

References

1902 births
1953 deaths
Alumni of Merton College, Oxford
People from Moncton
British Columbia Conservative Party MLAs